Jan Biegański (born 4 December 2002) is a Polish professional footballer who plays as a defensive midfielder for I liga club GKS Tychy, on loan from Lechia Gdańsk.

Football

Early years
Biegański started playing football for the youth side of GKS Katowice before joining the academy of Silent Dąbrowa Górnicza. In 2015, Biegański joined GKS Tychy, making his first team debut Raków Częstochowa during the 2017–18 season, becoming the youngest ever debutant for the club, aged 15. In the match against GKS Katowice the following season, Biegański came off the bench and given the captain's armband, becoming the youngest ever captain for GKS Tychy at the age of 15 years 355 days. Biegański spent three and a half seasons with GKS Tychy in I liga, making a total of 22 league appearances and scoring 2 goals.

Lechia Gdańsk
On 1 January 2021, Biegański officially joined Lechia Gdańsk. Unable to gain a regular place in the line-up under manager Tomasz Kaczmarek, on 26 August 2022 he was loaned back to GKS Tychy until the end of the season. Following a successful spell at his previous club and as a youth international, he was recalled on 23 November 2022. On 22 February 2023, the last day of the winter transfer window in Poland, he was yet again sent on loan to GKS until the end of the 2022–23 campaign.

References

2002 births
Living people
Sportspeople from Gliwice
Association football midfielders
Polish footballers
Poland youth international footballers
Poland under-21 international footballers
GKS Tychy players
Lechia Gdańsk players
Lechia Gdańsk II players
Ekstraklasa players
I liga players
IV liga players